Richard T. Moore (born July 7, 1943) is a Democratic politician from Massachusetts and a former member of the Massachusetts State Senate.

Biography
Richard T. Moore was born in Milford, Massachusetts. He is married to the former Joanne Bednarz of Uxbridge, Massachusetts. The couple lives in Uxbridge.

Moore is a graduate of Clark University, and he earned a master's degree in Student Personnel Administration from Colgate University. He has completed additional graduate-level courses at Clark and the University of Massachusetts Amherst.

Career
Richard Moore was first elected to the Massachusetts State Senate on April 23, 1996. He served as Chairman of the Joint Committee on Health Care Financing and was a member of the Senate Committee on Bills in Third Reading; the Senate Committee on Post-Audit and Oversight; the Joint Committee on Higher Education; and the Joint committee on Bonding, Capital Expenditures and State Assets.

From 1977 to 1994, Moore was a nine-term member of the Massachusetts House of Representatives. During that tenure, Moore chaired three standing committees — Taxation, State Administration, and Election Laws — and served on numerous other committees and commissions.

He co-chaired the 1992 Bill Clinton for President campaign in Massachusetts and was chosen as a member of the Presidential Electoral College that year. In 1994, President Clinton nominated Moore to serve as Associate Director of the Federal Emergency Management Agency (FEMA). He was subsequently confirmed by the United States Senate and served in that role under the Clinton Administration for two years, during which he led efforts to develop a National Mitigation Strategy — a comprehensive, nationwide plan to help individuals, communities, and states reduce the risk of disaster from natural and technological hazards. In 1996, he was presented with the "Distinguished Service Award" by FEMA Director James Lee Witt.

He is a member of the Emergency Management Section of the American Society for Public Administration and co-chair, of the National Conference of State Legislatures' (NCSL) Task Force on Homeland Security and Emergency Response — created in the aftermath of the September 11 terrorist attacks. He is also a member of Executive Committee of the NCSL. In 2009 he was elected the President-elect of the National Conference of State Legislatures. He took office as president of NCSL, at the annual meeting in Louisville, KY on July 28, 2010.

In early 2013, Moore was promoted to the third highest post in the Massachusetts State Senate, President Pro Tempore.

On Tuesday, November 4, 2014, Moore was defeated by Ryan Fattman in the Massachusetts general election.

See also
 2013–2014 Massachusetts legislature

References

Sources
 General Court profile
 Official Policy and Constituent Services web site

Democratic Party Massachusetts state senators
Clark University alumni
1943 births
Living people
People from Uxbridge, Massachusetts
People from Milford, Massachusetts
University of Massachusetts Amherst alumni